Chariesthes obliquevittata is a species of beetle in the family Cerambycidae. It was described by Stephan von Breuning in 1960. It is known from Tanzania.

References

Endemic fauna of Tanzania
Chariesthes
Beetles described in 1960